Paul Fox (born 10 April 1979) is an English actor, known for portraying Mark Redman in Coronation Street, Will Cairns in Emmerdale and Dr Jeff Goodwin in The Royal.

Early life
Born in Truro, Cornwall, Fox moved to Greasby in Merseyside whilst still a baby. He has one older brother, Christian. He attended Hilbre High School in West Kirby, the Glenda Jackson Youth Theatre in Birkenhead, and West Cheshire College, where he took a BTEC national diploma in performing arts.

Career
Fox made his television debut playing the nephew of Christopher Eccleston's character in the Channel 4 drama Hearts and Minds. He won the role after a casting director visited the Glenda Jackson Youth Theatre, looking for people to play a group of schoolchildren in the drama. Fox later won a role in the ITV children's drama Children's Ward, and went on to play Will Cairns in Emmerdale from 1997 to 1999.

Fox played Mark Redman, the long-lost son of Mike Baldwin, in Coronation Street from 1999 to 2000. Fox left the programme when Mark, who had started an affair with Mike's fiancé Linda Sykes, confessed to it on Mike and Linda's wedding day, and was thrown out by Mike. Fox reprised the role in 2001 and also in 2006, around the time of Mike's death from Alzheimer's.

Fox played Dr Jeff Goodwin in The Royal from 2003 to 2007 and also appeared in Casualty in 2008, playing Simon Tanner. His other television credits include Moving On, Doctors the Canadian science fiction drama Starhunter, and Westworld.

Fox's film credits include Elizabeth (1998), Simon: An English Legionnaire (2002), Deserter (2002), and the short film Hero. He made his stage debut while appearing in Emmerdale in a production of Romeo and Juliet at the Theatre Royal, York playing Romeo. Fox's other stage credits include Salonika, Twelfth Night, A Midsummer Night's Dream and Too Cold for Snow.

Filmography

References

External links

1979 births
Living people
English male film actors
English male Shakespearean actors
English male soap opera actors
English male stage actors
People from Birkenhead
People from Truro